Ian Alexander Robb (born 1 June 1955) is an English former professional footballer who played as a defender in the Football League for York City, in non-League football for Frickley Athletic, Selby Town and Olympia Station, and was on the books of Liverpool without making a league appearance.

References

1955 births
Living people
Footballers from Doncaster
English footballers
Association football defenders
Liverpool F.C. players
York City F.C. players
Frickley Athletic F.C. players
Selby Town F.C. players
English Football League players